Haughton Ackroyd (24 June 1894 – 14 February 1979) was a footballer who played in the Football League for Wigan Borough. Born in Todmorden, England, Ackroyd made his debut for Wigan in March 1922 in a 3–3 draw against Darlington. He made five league appearances for the club before being released at the end of the 1921–22 season.

References

1894 births
1979 deaths
English footballers
Association football goalkeepers
Wigan Borough F.C. players
English Football League players
Lytham F.C. players